This list comprises all players who have participated in at least one league match for the Western Mass Pioneers since the USL began keeping archived records in 2003. Players who were on the roster but never played a first-team game are not listed; players who appeared for the team in other competitions (US Open Cup, CONCACAF Champions League, etc.) but never actually made an USL appearance are noted at the bottom of the page where appropriate.

A "†" denotes players who only appeared in a single match.
A "*" denotes players who are known to have appeared for the team prior to 2003.

A
  Michael Adam
  Jose Alves
  Stephen Arias
  Paul Armstrong
  Jhonny Arteaga
  Anthony Augustine

B
  Gregory Bajek
  Greg Balicki
  Almir Barbosa
  Ben Bingham
  Callum Bissett
  Jeremy Bonomo
  Patrick Boucher
  Keith Boudreau
  Pedro Braz
  Justin Brewer
  Emmanuel Brito
  Tucson Brown
  Noel Bunsie

C
  Robert Cavener
  Edens Chery
  Kevin Chevalier
  Ben Clark
  Chris Cleary
  Nico Colaluca
  Joshua Cole
  Evan Coleman
  Jonathan Cook
  Steve Covino
  Matt Cross
  Kevin Cumberbatch
  Shane Curran-Hays

D
  Daniel Dalipi
  Jeff Deren
  Mateus Dos Anjos
  Adrian Dubois

E
  Steven Estrada

F
  Dennis Fenemore
  Anthony Fernandes
  Kyle Fletcher
  Eddie Floyd
  Brian Francolini

G
  Joe Germanese
  Matt Glaeser
  Marco Gomes
  James Greenslit
  Sam Groves

H
  Brendan Hankard
  Peter Hassler
  Rafael Henckel
  Andrew Henshaw

I
  Vadim Ivanyushchenko

J
  Rob Jachym
  Matthew Robert Jones

K
  Greg Kilkenny
  Yan Klukowski
  Neil Krause

L
  Tim Larocca
  Fabien Lewis
  Mike Lima

M
  Everson Maciel
  David Mahoney
  Ahmad Manning
  Rodrigo Marion
  Andrew Mattarazzo
  Omar McFarlane
  Daniel McGarry
  Kevin McMenamin
  Gabriel Mercier
  Chris Mogavaro
  Federico Molinari
  Yuri Moreira
  David Moya-Castillo

N
  Mark Nerkowski

O
  Bryan O'Quinn

P
  Lindon Pecorelli
  Jesse Pereira
  Adam Perron
  Anthony Petrarca
 USA   Alex Patino

Q
  Rigels Qosa

R
  Kevin Radziwon
  Kofi Remey
  Bruno Resende
  Chris Riley
  Chris Rosswess

S
  Mersad Sahanic
  Jamie Sampson
  Roy Sandeman
  Bobby Shuttleworth
  Craig Stewart
  Chris Stoker

T
  Germán Tagle
  Patrick Teague
  Kyle Teixeira
  James Thorpe
  Helton Tostes
  Kevin Trapp
  Brandon Tyler
  David Tyrie

V
  Derek Valego
  John Voight

W
  Adam Wallace
  Peyton Warwick
  Jay Willis
  Easton Wilson
  Leszek Wrona

Z
  Bryan Zobre

Sources

2010 Western Mass Pioneers stats
2009 Western Mass Pioneers stats
2008 Western Mass Pioneers stats
2007 Western Mass Pioneers stats
2006 Western Mass Pioneers stats
2005 Western Mass Pioneers stats
2004 Western Mass Pioneers stats
2003 Western Mass Pioneers stats

References

Western Mass Pioneers
 
Association football player non-biographical articles